Life's a Bitch is a Canadian short comedy-drama film, directed by François Jaros and released in 2013. The film stars Guillaume Lambert as Philippe, a man struggling through a painful breakup.

The film premiered in October 2013 at the Festival Tous Écrans in Geneva, Switzerland, and had its North American premiere at the 2014 Sundance Film Festival. It was distributed commercially as the opening film to screenings of Stéphane Lapointe's feature film Les maîtres du suspense.

The film won the Jutra Award for Best Live Action Short Film at the 17th Jutra Awards in 2015.

References

External links

2013 films
2013 short films
Canadian comedy-drama films
French-language Canadian films
Canadian drama short films
Canadian comedy short films
2010s Canadian films